Guitry Department is a department of Lôh-Djiboua Region in Gôh-Djiboua District, Ivory Coast. In 2021, its population was 197,236 and its seat is the settlement of Guitry. The sub-prefectures of the department are Dairo-Didizo, Guitry, Lauzoua, and Yocoboué.

History
Guitry Department was created in 2009 as a second-level subdivision via a split-off from Divo Department. At its creation, it was part of Sud-Bandama Region.

In 2011, districts were introduced as new first-level subdivisions of Ivory Coast. At the same time, regions were reorganised and became second-level subdivisions and all departments were converted into third-level subdivisions. At this time, Guitry Department became part of Lôh-Djiboua Region in Gôh-Djiboua District.

Notes

2009 establishments in Ivory Coast
States and territories established in 2009
Departments of Lôh-Djiboua